The Hanlı-Bostankaya Railway Line is a  standard gauge railway line from Hanlı to Bostankaya. The line was built in 1995 and is only used by freight trains.

External links
 TCDD History: Electrification Trains of Turkey

Railway lines in Turkey
Standard gauge railways in Turkey
Railway lines opened in 1995